Francis Bostick is an American engineer, currently a Distinguished Professor Emeritus and the Hayden Head Centennial Professor Emeritus at Cockrell School of Engineering, University of Texas at Austin. He was awarded the Chancellor's Council Outstanding Teaching Award.

References

Year of birth missing (living people)
Living people
University of Texas at Austin faculty
21st-century American engineers